Economía Feminista, in English: Feminist Economics, is an Argentinian digital media, focused on disclosure and creation of economics information about the gender gap. The media is managed by Mercedes D`Alessandro, Magalí Brosio, Violeta Guitart and Agurtzane Urrutia.

Concept
Economía Femini(s)ta, is a portmanteau of feminista and minita. It attempts to end stereotypes about women. It was created in 2015 and its goal is to be a source of economic data to help to display economic differences by gender, especially in Argentina.

Awards
Economía Feminista was awarded the Lola Mora prize in 2016 for the best digital media by Dirección General de la Mujer, promoted by Buenos Aires city's Legislature

Sources

Digital media
Feminist blogs